Jimmy the Gent may refer to:

 Jimmy the Gent (film), a 1934 American comedy-crime film
 James Burke (gangster) (1931–1996), American gangster known as Jimmy the Gent